South Ossetia is a region in the North Caucasus that is under the effective control of the self-declared Republic of South Ossetia–the State of Alania but recognized by most of the international community as part of Georgia. The Government of Georgia has established a Provisional Administration of South Ossetia which it considers to be the legal government of South Ossetia.

Both entities have adopted emblems to represent themselves which are of a similar design. The emblems consist of a red disc featuring a Caucasian leopard with seven white mountains in the background. The blazon is "disc gules, a leopard passant or spotted sable on a ground or with a background of seven mountains argent." The mountains symbolize the Ossetian landscape, while the leopard is an iconic inhabitant of the Caucasus mountains.

Republic of South Ossetia–the State of Alania
The coat of arms of the Republic of South Ossetia–the State of Alania were adopted on 19 May 1999 by the Parliament of South Ossetia. The design is based on Vakhushti Bagrationi's "Banner of Ossetia" which dates from 1735. Around the shield, the name of the country is written in Ossetian (Республикӕ Хуссар Ирыстон) above and in Russian (Республика Южная Осетия) below.

Provisional Administration of South Ossetia
The Provisional Administration of South Ossetia was established by the Government of Georgia April in 2007. It uses an emblem depicting a Caucasian leopard and mountainous landscape without a surrounding legend. This emblem is identical to the emblem used by the Republic of North Ossetia-Alania in Russia.

Historical emblems
Between 1922 and 1990, South Ossetia was an autonomous oblast of the Georgian Soviet Socialist Republic known as the South Ossetian Autonomous Oblast. As an autonomous oblast, it didn't have its own coat of arms, instead the Emblem of the Georgian SSR was used for official purposes.

See also
Flag of South Ossetia
Coat of arms of the Republic of North Ossetia-Alania

References

Ossetia
Ossetia
Ossetia